Abell 133 is a galaxy cluster in the Abell catalogue.

See also
 List of Abell clusters

References

133
Galaxy clusters
Abell richness class 0
Cetus (constellation)